Francis Joseph O'Donnell  (31 August 1911 – 4 September 1952) was a Scottish professional footballer. He was the older brother of fellow footballer Hugh O'Donnell. The siblings stayed together for the first sixteen years of their careers, both playing concurrently for Celtic, Preston North End and Blackpool. He also made six appearances for the Scotland national team.

Career
O'Donnell started his professional career with Celtic. O'Donnell made 78 Scottish league appearances and scored 51 goals, which equated to an average of a goal every 1.5 games.

His scoring touch remained when he signed for Preston North End in 1935, netting 36 goals in 92 league games. He scored a consolation goal as Preston lost in the 1937 FA Cup Final to Sunderland.

In 1937, O'Donnell signed for Preston's West Lancashire derby rivals Blackpool. He made his Blackpool debut on 4 December 1937, in a draw at Middlesbrough. He scored his first goal for the club two weeks later, in a 2–1 victory at West Bromwich Albion. He went on to score another nine goals in his remaining fourteen games of the season. The following season, 1938–39, O'Donnell scored seven goals in thirteen appearances, including a hat-trick in a 5–1 victory over Chelsea at Bloomfield Road on 8 October 1938.

O'Donnell left Blackpool during the 1945–46 season, the final inter-war campaign, and signed for Aston Villa. In his one season at Villa Park, he scored fourteen goals in 29 league appearances. After stints with Nottingham Forest and Raith Rovers, O'Donnell became player/manager of non-league club Buxton in 1947. He died just five years later, on 4 September 1952, aged 41.

International career
Following his £10,000 transfer to Blackpool F.C. in November 1937, O'Donnell represented Scotland on two occasions, adding to the four appearances made while with Preston North End, scoring goals in each of his first two appearances, against England and Austria.

References

Sources

External links
O'Donnell's profile at Spartacus Educational (erroneously states his date of birth as 31 August 1913)

1911 births
1952 deaths
People from Buckhaven
Footballers from Fife
Scottish footballers
Scotland international footballers
Celtic F.C. players
Preston North End F.C. players
Blackpool F.C. players
Aston Villa F.C. players
Nottingham Forest F.C. players
Raith Rovers F.C. players
Buxton F.C. players
Scottish Football League players
English Football League players
Scottish football managers
Buxton F.C. managers
Brentford F.C. wartime guest players
Association football forwards
FA Cup Final players
Wellesley Juniors F.C. players
Scottish Junior Football Association players